Willard Harris Chandler (November 18, 1830March 24, 1901) was an American educator, farmer, and Republican politician.  He served in the Wisconsin State Senate and Assembly, and was President pro tempore of the Wisconsin Senate for the 1865 and 1866 sessions.

Biography
Chandler was born on November 18, 1830 in Brattleboro, Vermont. He married Lucinda Wellman (1830–1893) in 1854 and they moved to Wisconsin that same year. They initially lived in Darien, Wisconsin and then soon moved to Windsor, Wisconsin before relocating to a farm in Burke, Wisconsin near Sun Prairie in 1869. After the death of his first wife, he married Harriet Adelaide Salisbury (1845–1898) in 1895. Chandler died at his farm on March 24, 1901.

Career
Chandler held a variety of local offices, including town and county school superintendent, and county supervisor. He was a member of the Assembly from 1861 to 1862 and again in 1870. He was elected to the Senate in 1863, where he eventually became president pro tem. He was the Republican nominee for state superintendent of education in 1892, coming in second with 169,739 votes to 176,666 for the incumbent, Democrat Oliver Elwin Wells; 13,258 for Prohibitionist L. Wesley Underwood; and 9,784 for Populist Charles Hatch.

References

External links

People from Brattleboro, Vermont
People from Delavan, Wisconsin
People from Sun Prairie, Wisconsin
Republican Party Wisconsin state senators
Republican Party members of the Wisconsin State Assembly
1830 births
1901 deaths
19th-century American politicians
School superintendents in Wisconsin
County supervisors in Wisconsin
Educators from Wisconsin
Farmers from Wisconsin